Calixto Oriola Zaldivar (September 13, 1904 – October 13, 1979) was a Filipino lawyer and politician who was a Supreme Court Justice from 1964 to 1974 best known in Philippine history for being one of only four dissenting voices against the constitutionality of the Philippines' 1973 constitution in the 1973 case known as Javellana v. Executive Secretary, despite pressure by the authoritarian government of Ferdinand Marcos to vote in the constitution's favor.

He is honored by having his name inscribed on the wall of remembrance at the Philippines' Bantayog ng mga Bayani, which honors "the heroes and martyrs who fought against the Marcos dictatorship."

Early life and education 
Zaldivar was born in Pandan, Antique to Pedro Telmo Gella Zaldivar, a former Justice of the Peace in Pandan and Manuela Palacios Ledesma of Culasi. But he later was adopted by his father's sister Salvacion and her husband Enrique Gella Oriola (who's also his father's cousin). According to his descendants, he retained his original surname then used the adoptive (Oriola) as his middle name, in honor of his foster parents. He graduated in law from the University of the Philippines in 1928 and was the third placer in that year's bar examination.

Career 
Zaldivar's career in Philippine government was unusual in that he held positions in all branches of the government. In the Legislative, he was elected as a municipal councilor of Pandan from 1928 to 1934 and served as a Representative of Antique from 1934 to 1941; in the Executive branch, as Governor of Antique from 1951 to 1955 and as assistant and then acting Executive Secretary of President Diosdado Macapagal in 1964; and in the judiciary, as Associate Justice of the Supreme Court from 1964 to 1974.

Dissenting opinion against Martial Law

Zaldivar, along with Chief Justice Roberto Concepcion, were the dissenting voices during the deliberations on the issues arising out of the declaration of the Martial Law and the validity of the 1973 Constitution. They argued that the 1973 Constitution was not in force and effect because it was not validly ratified by the Filipino people.  Despite pressure to agree to a ruling which would legitimize the Martial law government of Ferdinand Marcos and his ideology of constitutional authoritarianism, Zaldivar and Concepcion persisted in their dissent.

His positions as part of the Philippine Supreme court emphasized civil and political liberties at a time when their value were being questioned, and he was known for being a proponent of the social sciences, religion, law, government and statesmanship.

References 

1904 births
Karay-a people
Members of the House of Representatives of the Philippines from Antique (province)
Central Philippine University alumni
University of the Philippines alumni
20th-century Filipino lawyers
Governors of Antique (province)
Associate Justices of the Supreme Court of the Philippines
Members of the Philippine Legislature
Members of the National Assembly of the Philippines
Executive Secretaries of the Philippines
Macapagal administration cabinet members
Individuals honored at the Bantayog ng mga Bayani
Judges and justices honored at the Bantayog ng mga Bayani
Filipino Freemasons
Marcos martial law victims
Members of the Philippine Independent Church
1979 deaths